Arshad Ayub Khan (born 28 March 1967) is a Pakistani politician and businessman who had been a member of the Provincial Assembly of Khyber Pakhtunkhwa from August 2018 till January 2023. He was born in Rehana, as the third child of his father Shaukat Ayub, a local businessman and son of the late Field Marshal Muhammad Ayub Khan. He would attend Burn Hall College through his childhood up until completing his metric education. He would then pursue higher education by graduating from Concord University.

Political career

He began his political career running in the 2008 Pakistani General Election for Constituency PK-50, as an independent candidate, but was unsuccessful in his attempt.

He was elected to the Provincial Assembly of Khyber Pakhtunkhwa as a candidate of Pakistan Tehreek-e-Insaf from Constituency PK-41 (Haripur-II) in 2018 Pakistani general election, by gaining 14,000 more votes then the runner up, Raja Faisal Zaman. 

He is served as District Development Advisory Committee (DDAC) Chairman of District Haripur as well as the Provincial Minister For Irrigation (KPK) from 29 November 2021 until 18 January 2023.

References

Living people
Arshad
Pakistan Tehreek-e-Insaf MPAs (Khyber Pakhtunkhwa)
1974 births